The Student Prince is a 1954 American musical film directed by Richard Thorpe and starring Ann Blyth, Edmund Purdom, John Ericson, Louis Calhern, Edmund Gwenn, S. Z. Sakall and Betta St. John. The film is an adaptation of the 1924 operetta of the same name composed by Sigmund Romberg with lyrics by Dorothy Donnelly. The film's screenplay was written by Sonya Levien and William Ludwig.

Based on the stage play Old Heidelberg by Wilhelm Meyer-Förster (itself an adaptation of his obscure 1898 novel Karl Heinrich), the film is about a brash young prince of a small German kingdom who must choose between his romance with a barmaid and his impending royal duties. It was filmed and released in CinemaScope and Ansco Color.

During production, original star Mario Lanza left the project before principal photography, necessitating his last-minute replacement by the lesser-known Purdom. Because of the contractual agreement between Metro-Goldwyn-Mayer and Lanza, songs that the Lanza had recorded were dubbed over Purdom's voice.

Plot
Near the turn of the 20th century, young Prince Karl of Karlsburg, a small but fiercely proud kingdom within the German Empire, is the grandson of one of a handful of petty kings within German-speaking central Europe.

Karl has been raised most of his life for the military, but when it comes time for him to marry, the princess who has been picked for him cannot stand his stiff formality. His tutor recommends that he be sent to a university in Heidelberg to develop an easier, more sociable manner.

He eventually slips into the social mix at the university, becomes accepted by his peers and falls deeply in love with Kathie, a pretty, popular and musically inclined barmaid who holds court in the local biergarten. When his grandfather dies unexpectedly, Karl must marry the princess and take his place in Karlsburg. He returns to Heidelberg one last time to bid Kathie a poignant farewell.

Cast

 Ann Blyth as Kathie Ruder
 Edmund Purdom as Prince Karl
 Mario Lanza as Karl's singing voice
 John Ericson as Count Von Asterburg
 Louis Calhern as King Ferdinand of Karlsburg
 Edmund Gwenn as Prof. Juttner
 S.Z. Sakall as Joseph Ruder (credited as S.Z. "Cuddles" Sakall)
 Betta St. John as Princess Johanna
 John Williams as Lutz
 Evelyn Varden as Queen
 John Hoyt as Prime Minister
 Richard Anderson as Lucas
 Roger Allen as Von Fischtenstein
 Steve Rowland as Feuerwald
 Chris Warfield as Richter
 Gilbert Legay as Von Buhler
 Archer MacDonald as Head Corps Servant
 Charles Davis as Hubert
 John Qualen as Willie Klauber
 Gordon Richards as Major Domo

Production
The film's credits mention "the singing voice of Mario Lanza"; Lanza had originally been cast as Prince Karl, but he walked off the picture and was eventually fired.  Under the terms of the eventual settlement between MGM and Lanza, the studio retained the rights to use the songs for the film's soundtrack that Lanza had already recorded. The songs, including "Beloved"–written specially for the film–and the well-remembered "Serenade", from the original show, would become some of those most identified with Lanza, even though they were mouthed in the film by Edmund Purdom, who took over the role of Prince Karl. Ann Blyth played opposite Lanza in the 1951 blockbuster The Great Caruso.

The film was directed by Richard Thorpe, who replaced original director Curtis Bernhardt, and was produced by Joe Pasternak. The screenplay was written by Sonya Levien and William Ludwig based on the operetta The Student Prince by Sigmund Romberg and Dorothy Donnelly, which was in turn based on the 1901 play Old Heidelberg by Wilhelm Meyer-Förster. New scenes and rewritten dialogue not found in the stage production were also added, although the basic plot remained the same. Additional songs were specially written by Nicholas Brodszky and Paul Francis Webster. Many of Donnelly's original stage lyrics were completely changed for the film. The story has been adapted for the screen several times, including the American silent film Old Heidelberg (1915), the German silent film Old Heidelberg (1923), Ernst Lubitsch's The Student Prince in Old Heidelberg (1927) and Ernst Marischka's Old Heidelberg (1959).

Reception
The film was a financial success. According to MGM records, it earned $2,528,000 in the U.S. and Canada and $2,813,000 in other countries, resulting in a profit of $451,000.

Selected songs
 "Serenade"
 "Deep In My Heart, Dear"
 "Summertime in Heidelberg"
 "Beloved"
 "I'll Walk with God"
 "Drinking Song"
 "Come Boys", etc.

Soundtrack
RCA Victor issued two different soundtrack recordings, both featuring the voice of Lanza. The first, in 1954, was a genuine film soundtrack recording in monophonic sound. Rather than reissuing the original soundtrack in stereophonic sound (which would have been possible as the film's audio was in four-track stereo, and stereo records were released starting in 1958), RCA Victor recorded and released an all-new stereo album with Lanza in 1959. The original Dorothy Donnelly lyrics were restored to the album. Both albums included the three additional songs written specially for the film version ("Summertime in Heidelberg", "I'll Walk with God" and "Beloved"), and both albums omit Kathie's solo, "Come Boys."

References

External links

 
 
 
 

Metro-Goldwyn-Mayer films
1954 films
1950s historical musical films
American historical musical films
CinemaScope films
Films about princes
Films about royalty
Films directed by Richard Thorpe
American films based on plays
Student societies in Germany
Operetta films
Films based on operettas
Films set in Heidelberg
Sound film remakes of silent films
Films produced by Joe Pasternak
Films with screenplays by William Ludwig
Films with screenplays by Sonya Levien
Films based on adaptations
Films set in Europe
Films set in Germany
Films set in the 19th century
1950s English-language films
1950s American films